USS Wemootah (SP-201) was a United States Navy patrol vessel and net tender in commission from 1917 to 1919.

Wemootah was built as a civilian motorboat of the same name in 1913 by the Gas Engine and Power Company and the  Charles L. Seabury Company at Morris Heights in the Bronx, New York. The U.S. Navy purchased her from her owner, A. Gardner Cooper of New York City, on 16 June 1917 for World War I service as a patrol vessel. She was commissioned as USS Wemootah (SP-201) on 7 July 1917.

Operating from the Rosebank Section Base on Staten Island, New York, Wemootah served in New York Harbor as a patrol craft and net tender through the end of World War I.

Wemootah was disarmed in January 1919 and put up for sale. Her name was stricken from the Navy Directory on 13 June 1919, and she was sold to Mr. W. O. Graves of New York City on 10 October 1919.

Notes

References

NavSource Online: Section Patrol Craft Photo Archive: Wemootah (SP 201)

Patrol vessels of the United States Navy
World War I patrol vessels of the United States
Ships built in Morris Heights, Bronx
1916 ships